Penny of Top Hill Trail is a 1921 American silent Western comedy film based on the 1919 novel by Belle Kanaris Maniates. It was directed by Arthur Berthelet and stars Bessie Love. The film was produced by Andrew J. Callaghan Productions and distributed by Federated Film Exchanges of America. The film is presumed lost.

Plot 
When Penny (Love) goes to a ranch, she is mistaken for a thief. She encounters the ranch foreman (Oakman), who tries to reform her. When another girl is revealed to be the real thief, Penny's reputation is cleared, and she reveals her true identity: a film actress on vacation. She and the foreman realize their love for each other, and Penny decides to stay on the ranch with him.

Cast 
 Bessie Love as Penny
 Wheeler Oakman as Kurt Walters
 Raymond Cannon as Jo Gary
 Harry De Vere as Louis Kingdon
 Lizette Thorne as Mrs. Kingdon
 Gloria Holt as Betty Kingdon
 George Stone as Francis Kingdon
 Herbert Hertier as Hebier

Production 
Exteriors were filmed in Tucson, Arizona.

After its release, producer Andrew J. Callaghan sued Federated Film Exchanges, saying that the distributor had not paid the full amount to distribute this film, The Midlanders, and Bonnie May.

Release 
Upon its release, some theaters showed the film with The Hope Diamond Mystery and a Ham and Budd comedy.

Reception 
Overall, the film received positive reviews and was successful at the box office. The wardrobe, atypical for Western films, and Love's frequent hairstyle changes distracted some viewers from the plot.

References

External links 

 
 
 
 

1921 films
1920s Western (genre) comedy films
1921 lost films
American black-and-white films
Films based on American novels
Lost American films
Lost Western (genre) comedy films
Silent American Western (genre) comedy films
Films directed by Arthur Berthelet
1920s American films
1920s English-language films